Disturbing tha Peace is the second compilation album released by record label Disturbing tha Peace. Artists who appear on the album include Ludacris, Bobby V, I-20 and Shawnna. This album has been certified Gold by the RIAA.

The first single from the album was "Georgia" by Ludacris and Field Mob featuring Jamie Foxx. The original edition featured lyrics from Ray Charles's "Georgia On My Mind", but a disagreement with his recording company led to a re-recording of the song. The second single was Shawnna's only song on the album, "Gettin' Some".

Track listing
Credits adapted from the album's liner notes.

Sample Credits
 "Georgia" contains an interpolation from "Georgia on My Mind", written by Hoagy Carmichael and Stuart Gorrell.
 "Gettin' Some" contains a sample from "Blowjob Betty" as recorded by Too Short, written by Todd Shaw, Ramon Gooden, and Stuart Jordan.
 "Come See Me" contains a sample of "Aaja Sajan Aaja" as performed by Alka Yagnik, written by Anand Bakshi and Laxmikant–Pyarelal.
 "I'll Be Around" contains samples from "Send My Lover Back" as recorded by Black Heat, written by Phil Guilbeau.
 "Two Miles an Hour (Remix)" contains samples from "Little Child Runnin' Wild", written and recorded by Curtis Mayfield.
 "You Ain't Got Enough" contains samples from "If We Don't Make It, Nobody Can" as recorded by Tom Brock, written by Tom Brock, Barry White and Robert Relf.
 "Family Affair" contains excerpts from "Please Don't Leave Me Lonely", written and performed by King Floyd.

Charts

Weekly charts

Year-end charts

Certifications

References

2005 compilation albums
Albums produced by DJ Toomp
Albums produced by Needlz
Albums produced by Polow da Don
Albums produced by Salaam Remi
Def Jam Recordings compilation albums
Ludacris albums
Record label compilation albums
Disturbing tha Peace albums